The following is a chronological list of telenovelas produced by TV Azteca:

Filmography

1993–99

2000s

2010s

2020s

References 

 
TV Azteca